

Stephan Krehl (5 July 1864 – 9 April 1924, in Leipzig) was a German composer, teacher, and theoretician.  His writings include Traité général de la musique and Théorie de la musique et de science de la composition. His pupils included Else Streit and the Spanish composer Pablo Sorozábal.

Works
String Quartet in A major, Op.17 (published and performed 1899)
Quintet for Clarinet and Strings in A major, Op.19
Piano Trio in D major, Op.32
Cello concerto in G minor, Op.37 (performed February 2, 1911)

References

External links

1864 births
1924 deaths
German classical composers
German music theorists
19th-century German composers
19th-century classical composers
German male classical composers
19th-century German male musicians
19th-century German musicologists